Matjaz Belsak (in Slovenian Matjaž Belšak; born 23 September 1992) is a Slovenian professional strongman competitor and powerlifter.

Biography

Early life 
Matjaž Belšak was born in a village Seničica, near Ljubljana, the capital of Slovenia on September 23 of 1992. He grew up in a family of cooks; his parents own a restaurant "Gostilna Belšak" where he still occasionally works as an apprentice chef. He graduated in Tourist Studies.

Powerlifting career 
Matjaž started working out in 2008, when he was 15, with a goal to become stronger. As his strength was increasing really fast, it soon became clear that he might be able to show some really decent results in couple of years. He decided to compete on his first powerlifting meet in 2010, when he was 17 years old. During his early years of strength related sports he set quite a few Slovenian national records in powerlifting and he even won the overall gold in GPC Slovenian Powerlifting nationals in 2010. In 2012 he won his first and only international powerlifting meet (GPC), totaling 875 kg / 1929 lbs (360 kg / 793,5 lbs in squat, 190 kg / 419 lbs in bench press and 325 kg / 716,5 in deadlift). After that competition he only focused on the sport of strongman.

Strongman career

Beginnings 
A former Slovenian strongman and Slovenia's strongest man at that time Gregor Stegnar saw the potential in the young powerlifter and inspired him to try strongman for the first time in 2012, offering him his mentorship. Matjaž placed right on top and was immediately in love with the sport. He started competing on better even better competitions in Slovenia and surrounding countries.

Becoming a PRO strongman 
Matjaž became a PRO strongman after winning Savickas classic competition in 2015, which enabled him to compete in the Strongman Champions League in the next season and rise his name on a whole new level, competing against some of the world's strongest men, while being just 20 years old and with that one of the youngest athletes to ever compete on this level.

Slovenia's Strongest Man 
Almost immediately after starting to compete in strongman, Matjaž won the title of Slovenia's strongest man in 2014 and did it again in 2015 He has kept that title until 2017. In 2018, 2019 and 2022 he, besides competing and winning, also took over the organisation of this very competition. There were no Slovenia's Strongest man competitions in the years of 2016, 2017, 2020 and 2021.

Strongman Champions League 

 During the 2013–2016 seasons Matjaž did only a few competitions during his first two years of competing in the Strongman Champions League, as he was mostly focusing on becoming stronger, but he competed in a lot of SCL events in 2016 and finished the season by taking the 5th place in the finals.
 In the season of 2017 Matjaž won all of the SCL competitions he took part in and even won the final in Mexico, becoming the 2017 Strongman Champion's League world champion, achieving one of his biggest goals to that day, as he stated in a video made a year before.

World's Strongest Man 
After a few successful years of competing on the international level, Matjaž was invited to compete in the World's Strongest Man.

 In 2015 World's Strongest Man in Malasya Matjaž successfully made his first appearance at the event. While he didn't qualify for the finals, he finished 3rd in the heat 5.
 In 2016 World's Strongest Man in Botswana Matjaž made it to the finals, finishing 9th overall.
 In 2017 World's Strongest Man in Botswana he was unable to make it to the finals, but he finished 3rd in the heat 1.
 In 2018 World's Strongest Man in Philippines Matjaž showed his best performance on a competition of this level, finishing on 7th place overall in the finals.

World's Strongest Team 

 Matjaž competed for the first time in this event in 2015 World's Strongest Team, taking the 1st place with Hafþór Júlíus Björnsson who competed under the name 'Vikings'. Yankees (Jerry Pritchett & Mike Burke) placed second while the Saxons (Eddie Hall &  Mark Felix) placed third. 
 He also competed in 2019 World's Strongest Team, finishing on 3rd place with Mikhail Shilyakov.

Europe's Strongest Man 
Matjaž competed on three different Europe's Strongest Man competitions, always finishing in the top 10:

 In 2015 Europe's Strongest Man he made his first appearance, finishing the competition on 5th place.
 In 2017 Europe's Strongest Man he placed 6th.
 In 2018 Europe's Strongest Man Matjaž finished on the 7th place.

Arnold Strongman Classic 
Matjaž competed on Arnold Strongman Classic events all over the world. His most important placings were:

 6th place at 2018 Arnold Strongman Classic USA in Columbus, OH.
 5th place at 2019 Arnold Strongman Classic USA in Columbus, OH.
 1st place at 2017 Arnold Strongman Classic Europe in Barcelona, Spain.
 2nd place at 2018 Arnold Strongman Classic Europe in Barcelona, Spain.
 1st place at 2017 Arnold Strongman Classic Poland.

Hip replacement and rehabilitation 
Matjaž had a complete right hip replacement on 24th of June 2021 because of an old injury. The injury made him unable to compete for some time. His first strongman competition after the hip replacement was Slovenia's Strongest man 2022, which he also won, just about a year after the surgery. During the rehabiitation he also competed at Slovenia's Armwrestling Championship 2022.

Physical characteristics 
Matjaž is 187 cm tall (6 ft 2 in) and weights around 150 kg (330 lbs) during the competitions season.

Daily life 
Matjaž trains most of the time in his home gym. He usually trains for 3–4 hours a day, besides his regular stretching and mobility routines. He usually has 5 meals per day and consumes between 5000 and 7000 calories daily. He tries to sleep for at least 8 hours every night.

Personal records 
 Log press: 
 Axle press:  (2017 Europe's Strongest Man)
 Squat:  (Raw / wraps)
 Deadlift:  (2019 Arnold Africa)
 Car deadlift:  x 16 reps (2014 SCL Hungary)
 Max. dumbbell lift: 
 Dumbbell lifts for reps (in 60 seconds):  x 14 reps (WR) (Mexico)
 Dumbbell lifts for reps (in 60 seconds):  x 9 reps (WR) (Canada)
 Viking press:  x 15 reps (2016 SCL Norway)
 Atlas stones: Fibo atlas stones set  FIBO Record
 Flipping 10 cars (3men): 36sec WR

Media appearances 
Despite being one of the strongest people on earth, Matjaž does not get that much media attention in Slovenia. However, he made a few appearances in Slovenian's most important media:

 In 2016 he gave an interview on a popular Slovenian radio show, hosted by Denis Avdić, where he was asked to pull a truck.
 In 2018 he gave an interview for the Slovenian national television.
 In 2019 Matjaž was a special guest on an annual event of Elektro Ljubljana, one of major energy suppliers in Slovenia, where he symbolically lifted a model of a transmission tower.
 In 2020 he gave an interview during one of the most watched Slovenian news shows on Pop TV.

References

External links 
 

1992 births
Living people
Slovenian strength athletes
Slovenian sportsmen
Slovenian powerlifters
Male powerlifters